Hasan Naqvi (حسن نقوى) was a Shia cleric from Lucknow, India who preached Twelver Shi'a Islam and came from a family of scholars known as "Khandaan-e-Ijtehad". 

He was born in India in 1935. His father was Maulana Syed Muhammad Naqvi, popularly known as Meeran Sahab, a noted Cleric himself. He studied initially in the Madrasa-e-Nazmia of Lucknow. Later on he was admitted in the Sultanul-Madaris in Lucknow. Completing his studies in Lucknow he went to Najaf-e-Ashraf in Iraq for higher studies. There he attended lectures of scholars like Ayatollah Aqae Khoee and Ayatollah Taba Tabai.

He preached in several countries including Kenya, Tanzania, Uganda, UK, USA, Canada and UAE.

He died on 18 October 1996 due to a renal failure and was buried at Imambara Jannat Ma'ab.

Scholars from Lucknow
Indian Shia clerics
Ijtihadi family
1935 births
1996 deaths